Swami Nigamananda Paramahansa (born Nalinikanta Chattopadhyay; 18 August 1880 – 29 November 1935) was an Indian yogi, guru and mystic well known in Eastern India. He is associated with the Shakta tradition and viewed as a perfect spiritual master of vedanta, tantra, yoga and prema or bhakti. His followers idealized him as their worshipped and beloved thakura.

Nigamananda was born into a Bengali Brahmin family in the hamlet of Kutabpur in Nadia district (at present Meherpur district Bangladesh). He was a sannyasi from Adi Shankar's dashanami sampradaya. After his ordination as a sannyasi, he came to be known as Paribrajakacharya Paramahansa Srimat Swami Nigamananda Saraswati Deva.

Nigamananda achieved siddhi (perfection) in four different sadhanas (spiritual disciplines): tantra, gyan, yoga and prema. Based on these experiences, he wrote five Bengali language books: Brahamcharya Sadhana (ब्रह्मचर्य साधन), Yogi Guru (योगिगुरु), Gyani Guru (ज्ञानीगुरु), Tantrika Guru (तांत्रिकगुरु), and Premik Guru (प्रेमिकगुरु). Nigamananda reportedly experienced the state of Nirvikalpa Samadhi.

After retiring from Saraswata Matha, Nigamananda spent the last fourteen years of his life in Puri. Durga Charan Mohanty, a school student, met him at Nilachala Kutir in 1930 and recognized him as sadguru. Mohanty became Nigamananda's disciple and wrote books for Nigamananda's establishment Nilachala Saraswata Sangha and translated Nigamananda's Bengali books into Odia. Under Mohanty's encouragement, more than 100 ashrams operate in Odisha. Mohanty continued to spread the message of Nigamananda until his death on 7 December 1985.

Life

Childhood, studies and service life (1880–1901) 

At his birth, Nigamananda was named Nalinikanta (নলিনীকান্ত, ନଳିନୀକାନ୍ତ, नलिनीकान्त - in Hindu meaning is: Lotus, water), per the wishes of his father, Bhuban Mohan and the advice of his father's guru, Swami Bhaskarananda Saraswati. At the age of thirteen (1893) Nalinikanta lost his mother Manikya Sundari Devi to cholera, pushing him into depression. In 1894-95 he passed the student scholarship examination and studied at Meherpur High School. In 1895 he entered Dhaka Asanulla Engineering College. In 1897 his father married him to a thirteen-year-old girl named Sudhansubala Devi of Halisahar. He completed his study in 1899 and joined a service in the District Board of Dinajpur, the estate of Rani Rashmoni. At the end of Vadra, 1901 (approximately five years after marriage) when he was serving as the supervisor of the Narayanpur Estate (Zamindari), Nalinikanta saw the shadowy image of his wife standing at the table glowering and silent while she was away at Kutabpur (Nalinikanta's village). He went to Kutabpur to inquire and learned that she had died just an hour before his vision. He unsuccessfully attempted to reach his wife through occult science.

Turning point 
Until he lost his wife, Nalinikanta had seen death as the ultimate end. Losing her led him to believe that there must be life after death. Nalinikanta became obsessed with this question. His inquiry took him to Madras (now Chennai) to study theosophy at the Theosophical Society at Adyar. Through a medium, he was able to talk to his wife, but remained unsatisfied. His discussions at the society led him to search for a yogi who could fulfill his desire to meet his dead wife and educate him in the true philosophy of "life after death".

Spiritual experience (1902–1905) 

One night Nalinikanta dreamed of a sadhu with a brilliant aura. He woke up to find the sadhu standing beside his bed. The sadhu handed him a bael leaf with a mantra written on it and then vanished. Nalinikanta asked many to help him understand its meaning. Finally he met Bamakhepa, a famous tantrik of Tarapith, Birbhum district. Nalinikanta took initiation (dikhshya) from him and was directed to chant his mantra for 21 days. Under Bamakhepa's guidance he had physical darshan of Tara Devi in the form of his wife. This darshan led him to another mystery. He saw Tara Devi coming out of his body and mingling with him. To solve this mystery, Bamakshepa advised Nalinikanta to attain the knowledge of Advaita from a vedantic guru. In 1902 he searched for a jnani guru. He met guru Satchidananda Saraswati at the holy place of Pushkar in the Indian state of Rajasthan. He realized that Satchidananda Saraswati was the sadhu who had given him the Tara mantra in his dream. Nalinikanta became his disciple,
and learned the theories of Brahman (god as the formless one), Brahma sutras and vedanta. He was initiated by the Satchidananda into renunciation and according to that principle changed his name to Nigamananda.

Satchidananda directed Nigamananda to undertake pilgrimages to the four institutions (Char Dham) of religious seats and realize for himself the significance of each, as the Hindus held these places of worship sacred. After these pilgrimages, he returned to the ashram.

On his arrival at the ashram, Sachidananda reviewed Nigamananda's pilgrimages and said: "My boy! You have travelled widely and seen the religious places and acquired knowledge and experience. All that I had to teach you has been accomplished but it is for you now to put my teachings into practice. You have to experience for yourself the truth of your being and this can only be done through concerted efforts as well as the practice and observance of yogic principles. Thus you now have to seek out a guru who will provide you the proper guidance in this line.

Again Nigamananda went out to seek a guru. In 1903 he met a "yogi guru" (yoga master) - whom he called "Sumeru Dasji" (otherwise known as Koot Hoomi Lal Singh or Kuthumi). Nigamananda was accepted as his disciple. Under Das's guidance he learned yoga. After hard practice, in the month of Poush 1904, Nigamananda was able to master Savikalpa samadhi (the trance in which the yogi loses his body consciousness and acquires a transcendental consciousness while retaining his individual identity). Soon after Nigamananda desired to experience the state of Nirvikalpa - the most advanced of yogic samadhis at Kamakshya, Guwahati Assam (Nilachal Hill). Nigamananda followers believe that he did enter by way of this samadhi and was returned into his body with the residual consciousness of "I am the master or guru" and in yoga he had visualized and practically understood in his own body his guru's vedic knowledge.

(The place where the "Nirvikalpa samadhi" was experienced by Swami Nigamananda has been identified. Assam Governor Janaki Ballav Patnaik inaugurated the Nirbikalpa Sidhi Sthal of Swami Nigamananda at Nilachal Hills in Kamakhya Dham, Guwahati on 20 December 2012.The Assam Tribune - Swami Nigamananda's Nirbikalpa Sidhia Sthal(निर्विकल्प  सिद्धि श्थल )at Guwahati identified.)

In 1904, he was in Kashi (now known as Varanasi), when goddess Annapurna appeared in another dream and told him that his knowledge was limited to formless god and not gone beyond that, hence he was still incomplete. He accepted her challenge and traveled to Gouri devi (a siddha yogini) to learn bhava sadhana. Gouri devi accepted him as disciple and taught him bhakti or prem (eternal nature of divine love play) to understand the physical world as the transformation of god in bhava sadhana.

Nigamananda's long and continued search for his guru, resembled the search undertaken by his future disciples to find him.

Recognition as paramahansa (1904) 
In 1904 Nigamananda went to Allahabad to see kumbha mela and learned that his master Sachidandand was in the area, staying with Sankaracarya of Sringeri Matha. He found Sankaracarya (mahant or superior) sitting on an elevated throne surrounded by 125 monks, including his guru. Seeing him, Nigamananda went first to pay his respects to his guru, and then to the higher-ranking mahant. The sadhu were upset by this perceived disrespect in not honoring the "mahant" first, but in response Nigamananda quoted the scripture: "Mannatha shri jagannatha madguru shri jagadguru madatma sarvabhutatma tasmai shri gurave namaha (मन्नाथ श्री जगन्नाथ मदगुरु श्री जगदगुरु मदात्मा सर्वभूतात्मा तस्मै श्री गुरवे नमः)", meaning, "My guru is highest in whole world, hence I should respect my guru first". Nigamananda further explained to the sadhu assemblies that "on the basis of the vedanta philosophy there was no difference between his 'Guru' (Shri Sachidanand Saraswati) and 'Jagadguru' (Shri Shankarcharya)".

Jagadguru Sankaracarya endorsed this response and recognized Nigamananda as one who had achieved spiritual enlightenment.
Jagadguru conferred him with the title "paramahansa" and came to known as "Paribrajakacharay Paramahansa Shree Mad Swami Nigamananda Saraswati Deva" (परिब्राजकचार्य परमहंस श्री मद स्वामी निगमानंद सरस्वती देव).

Death (1935) 
Nigamananda spent the last fourteen years of his life in Puri. He died in Calcutta on 29 November 1935.

Nigamananda's followers honor his memory, and gather at annual congregations (sammilani), and other ceremonial occasions.

His ashram at Halisahar, Saraswata Matha (previously Shanti Ashram) in Jorhat and Sundarbans are places of pilgrimage.

Mission 
Nigamananda's mission was to propagate sanatana dharma (सनातन धर्म), the spiritual foundation of the Hindu religion, to spread the "right kind of education" (सत् शिक्षा विस्तार) among people, to publish spiritual literature with emphasis on character building and to provide "service to all created beings" (नर देहे नारायण सेवा), with the attitude of serving the indwelling God.

In order to realize these objectives he enjoined his devotees to "lead an ideal family life" (आदर्श गृहस्थ जीवन गठन), to combine the power of spiritual associations (संघ शक्ति प्रतिष्ठा) and "to share or exchange spiritual feelings among the disciples" (भाव विनिमय).

Jayaguru (जयगुरु ଜୟଗୁରୁ জয়গুরু) 
To achieve the above objectives, he initiated thousands of interested men and women of all walks of life and taught them his spiritual practices. They were devoid of sectarian bias in that they did not provide a complete package of worship, prayer and meditation. He encouraged his disciples to meet periodically in groups (sangha) of three or more to offer prayer and worship to the guru, to exchange spiritual experiences and to chant "jayaguru" (जयगुरु ଜୟଗୁରୁ), a non-sectarian word he invented, meaning "Glory of, by, and for the Master". He instructed them to read spiritual books and devise ways and means for managing matha and ashrams and pledging to lead the life of a spiritually inspired ideal householder. He advised his disciples that the glory of God or Guru is experienced through the medium of the word "jayaguru". One can reach at God through this name since God is the Guru or Master of the Universe. People belonging to any sect or creed can accept this name without any risk to their progress in the religious life.

Philosophy and teachings 

Nigamananda was a sanyasi of the Adi Shankara cult. He studied vedanta philosophy due to Shankaracharya after he was initiated as a sanyasi of that order.

Nigamananda's core-teachings were that guru and istha are identical and that disciples should adopt ideals of Lord Shankar (i.e. the principles of gyan) and ideals of Lord Gaurang (i.e. the path of bhakti). He indicated that Shankar's disciplines were difficult and that Lord Gaurang offered an easier path. According to Nigamananda, Shankar and Gaurang provide a sweet combination of Gyan and Bhakti to lead the world in the right way.

Nigamananda's philosophy and teachings as per Chetanananda Saraswati are explained here:

Avatar and Sadguru 
Nigamananda never admitted that he was God-incarnate or an Avatar (अवतार) although many disciples fancied him as one. He stated that an incarnation is an exclusive descent of God on earth to uphold spiritual order. Although he could, the Avatar ordinarily does not enlighten or guide individuals. Through his agency righteousness is established and demonic forces are destroyed. Nigamananda wanted to be treated as a Sadguru (a perfect spiritual Master) who, on account of his quest over a succession of births and deaths, attained the knowledge of his Swaroop स्वरुप (true or potential nature, i.e., supreme universal consciousness). Scriptural evidence shows that Gautam himself had to pass through many births before realising the truth and becoming the Buddha. Nigamananda further pointed out that an Avatar does not always remain in the state allowing leela (divine play.)

Sadguru, Jagadguru and God 
According to Nigamananda the disciple should take his Guru to be the Jagadguru (or the World Master, the Purushottama) and not an ordinary human being, in tune with Krishna's statement in the Bhagavadgeeta:

Patanjali's aphorism expands this idea: "By contemplating on the form of one who has no attachments, concentration of mind is attained", Nigamananda advised his disciples to meditate on his physical form such that all the admirable qualities and attributes in him would get automatically transferred into their beings and fashion their souls. Further he assured that because he had, by employing three modes of spiritual practice, simultaneously experienced the nature of Brahman (ब्रह्म), Paramatma (परमात्मा) (supreme universal self) and Bhagawan (भगवान) (personal and universal Godhead.) He proclaimed that his disciples would simultaneously have such an experience. That, he said, "was his only expectation from his disciples and he would love to wait for the day to see that fulfilled".

Order of Spiritual Attainments 
According to Nigamananda, the theory of self-realization requires expanding the individual self to the status of the supreme universal self. The expansions can be directly practiced only by the most competent among the aspirant samyasis by means of precise intellectual inquiry, analysis and deep meditation, although service to the Master is the key to success in such pursuits as well. However, Nigamananda pointed out that true transcendental divine love and ecstasy could be properly experienced by the most fortunate ones only after they had attained monistic realization of the supreme as declared by Lord Krishna himself in the Bhagavadgeeta:

Reconciliation of Monistic and Dualistic Pursuits 
Unlike saints who recognized and preached a diversity of doctrines for self / God realisation and offered multiple paths to attain them, Nigamananda suggested the realisation of the oneness of self and the supreme universal self (or Parabrahman-परंब्रह्म) as the true and the highest goal of human life.

For most aspirants the path is one of true devotion to the perfect spiritual master (Sadguru) who initiates them. Rendering personal service to the Master and invoking his grace through prayers, chanting and simple meditation are the chief modes of spiritual practice for them. They will acquire non-dualistic realization that their Master is a realized soul (Brahmajnani-ब्रह्मज्ञानी) and experience bliss due to intense love for him over the course of time, when they are enabled to participate in his Leela (love play-लिला) for helping others.

Nigamananda pointed out that the path shown by Gauranga, who practiced and preached unconditional devotion and love for God, was rather narrow, inasmuch as it was directed to Sri Krishna as the only God. In order to broaden that path, Nigamananda suggested taking the master as an embodiment of Sri Krishna (or any other deity whom the aspirant loved), in which case the guide himself becomes the goal. In this way Nigamananda convincingly reconciled the two apparently contradictory creeds of Shankaracharya and Gauranga who advocated the principle and practice of apparent duality between the devotee and God. After all, Nigamananda pointed out that in the path of devotion and love the aspirant has to subdue or tame his ego adequately and hence he attains to the same stage as that of the monastic aspirant whose ego loses its identity on attaining to his goal. In the former case, the devotee's individuality is reduced to a trifle, overpowered by personal god-consciousness, whereas in the latter the aspirant loses his self-consciousness in the ocean of impersonal universal consciousness.

 Jnanachakra

Nigamananda pointed out that although the doctrine of monastic vedanta philosophy treats the supreme reality in terms of oneness of individual and universal consciousness, it does not systematically explain the structure of the material creation that is addressed by Samkhya philosophy.

This latter does not treat the supreme reality as well. Similarly, whereas Christianity emphasizes service and surrender as means to God realization, the Indian philosophy of Poorva Mimamsa prescribes various rituals for the attainment of personal and collective happiness despite cycles of birth and death.

By means of a Jnanachakra (ज्ञानचक्र) chart (the spheres of spiritual cosmology) which he presented in a pictorial form, Nigamananda identified different layers of consciousness inter-woven in the microcosm (body) and the macrocosm (the universe) and pointed out the levels that aspirants ultimately attain. In this chart he placed Sri Krishna and Sri Radha (or the Guru-गुरु and Yogamaya-योगमाया) in the transition between the non qualified (Nirguna) Brahman (निर्गुण ब्रह्म) and qualified (Saguna) Brahman (सगुण ब्रह्म), which he called Nitya or Bhavaloka (भाव लोक). (Yogamaya is a form of divine power, which incessantly attracts earth-bound souls and helps them realise their true blissful nature and participate in divine play).

Other key teachings 
Other key teachings of Nigamananda as stated by Chetnananda Saraswati are:
 Spiritual liberation requires the help of a liberated person (a Master Sadguru or simply Guru). In the Hindu scriptures that person is known as Guru. Without his grace or favor none can make progress. He who has attained the ultimate reality (Paramatman or Brahman) as one and the same as himself (the Atman) is the Guru.
 The Guru cannot be equated in importance to formal learning, pilgrimage or divinity. No other is more worthy of respect.
 The Guru is the embodiment of what the Vedanta teaches – the individual self (the Atman) is one and the same as the cosmic self (Paramatman or Brahman).
 A Sadguru never curses anyone. Even his anger helps the disciple. The advantage of depending on a Sadguru is unique and is superior to depending on God because God never materializes to give instructions.
 The Guru and the disciple are inseparable in a way. The Guru cannot exist without being a part of a true disciple's personality or character.
 The two pathways to liberation are by initiation into and observation of the austerities of sannyasa yoga or by service to a Sadguru. The former is extremely arduous – the disciple must in a sense die. In other words, he must lose body consciousness. But if one unconditionally loves the Guru by way of rendering service to him sincerely, spiritual liberation may be obtained relatively easily.
 Nothing substantial can be achieved without Guru's grace.
 The mantra that Guru gives during initiation and the disciple's chosen divinity (or Ista) are the same. Unless the Guru becomes the chosen divinity, the mantra received loses its power.
 Acquisition of disciples is not Guru's profession; it is his heart's inspiration. The Guru cares for and guides the disciple hoping that one day the disciple will get spiritually enlightened.

Yoga, theories and techniques 
The following theories are collected from the Oriya book Shri Shri Thakur Nigamananda (श्री श्री ठाकुर निगमानंद) and the writer, Durga Charan Mohanty-Banamali Dash:

Theory of jibanamukta upasana 
One of Nigamananda's major precepts was the theory of Jibanamukta Upasana (जीवनमुक्त उपासना), which he believed could lead the sadhaka to quick self-realization.

Karmic theory 
According to Nigamananda, karma is of three kinds viz. kriyaman, sanchita and prarbdha.
Enjoying the results of one's labour while alive is kriyaman; death before enjoyment produces sanchita karma or accumulated labour. Enjoying accumulated karma after rebirth is prarbdha. By virtue of sadhana, the effects of kriyaman and sanchita can be wiped out during a life but it is not possible to erase prarbdha. A person possessed with worldly ambitions is sure to continue the endless journey of birth and death. Jivatma leaves the gross body to travel in the spirit world or pret lok (ghost world). After undergoing karmic effects, it returns to the physical world with a body for the fulfillment of desires from its prior incarnation. How it moves from one world to another is a mystery. Yogis can perceive the mystery and tell the past sanskar of jiva.

On death 
Nigamananda said that one should remember that death is coming. Before working on good or evil deeds one should also remember that death is not far off. Contemplating death drives away the desire for sensual pleasure and evil thoughts and stops acts of injustice. Attachment to wealth and relations will then diminish. Earthly matters remain even after departure from this world. Only spiritual wealth remains as an asset to the individual. Those who have puffed with pride on account of their accomplishments will submit to the God of death meekly when that hour comes. Drunk with pride, some persons ill-treat their brethren. They will be left in the deserted crematory ground with the beasts and birds joyously waiting to feast upon their flesh. Thinking of this will drive evil thoughts from the mind.

Yoga 
Nigamananda wrote a great deal on Yoga. His theories and techniques can be found in his book "Yogi Guru". Samples:

Hatha yoga and Laya yoga 
Hatha yoga can be carried out when the body is made fit for the purpose. The body should be cleansed first of impurities through sat sadhna, the six elementary practices of yoga. Hatha yoga is completely different from laya yoga. Hatha yoga can make the body strong, enabling it to survive for four hundred years or more, whereas laya yoga helps the aspirant to attain union with the supreme. If the body is not kept purified both externally and internally with hatha yoga, attempting laya yoga would yield no result.

Dharana and dhyan 
Nigamananda taught that the breathing system is closely connected with the intricate workings of the mind. Therefore, practice of pranayama leads to calmer breathing and thereby maintains tranquility of mind. Mind is subjected to forces of disturbed thoughts owing to irregular breathing. He said
"I had applied myself to the higher practices of yoga, thereafter, i.e. dharana and dhyan (meditation)". The sadhaka is likely to peril his life if he does not take assistance of another during these advanced practices. During Dhāraṇā, the sadhaka experiences his own progress and when the estimated height in sadhana is achieved, he enters into successive steps of progress. While being absorbed in the practice of dhyan, the sadhaka may cross over to the state of samadhi. When he achieves this state of consciousness is not predictable. Until samadhi, the sadhaka gropes in the darkness aided by Guru.

Sampragyant samadhi 
Nigamananda pointed out that if earlier practices are perfected, the succeeding steps yield lasting results. The sadhaka enters samadhi as a matter of his own experience, including the awakening of kundalini. The upward and downward motion of kundalini is called Sampragyant Samadhi (सम्प्रज्ञात समाधि).

Works

Institutions founded

Garohill Yoga Ashram 
Nigamananda founded his first Yoga Ashram in 1905 (1312 BS) at Kodaldhoa in Garo Hills, which is called now "Garohill-Yogashrama" (गारोहिल योगाश्रम). His famous book "Yogi Guru" (योगिगुरु), was written and composed here in 14 days.

Saraswata Matha 

Nigamananda founded Shanti Ashram (शांति आश्रम) in 1912 at Jorhat to fulfill his three missions, to propagate Sanatana Dharma (spreading eternal religion), spreading true education and serve everybody as god incarnate.

He took a plot of land of Jorhat in Sibsagar district and founded this ashram there on Akshaya Tritiya, in the month of Baishakh (in 1319 BS according to Bengal calendar). This was called “Shanti Ashram” or Saraswata Matha (सारस्वत मठ), which went by the name of Assam-Bengal Saraswata Matha (आसाम बंगीय सारस्वत मठ) in the later years.
 Rishi Vidyalaya was an important school founded under this matha for yoga training.

Retirement 
Nigamananda initiated ten devout disciples into sanyas in the tradition of the "Saraswati" by order due to the great Sankaracharya, the juniormost among whom was "Swami Nirvanananda Saraswati" (an erudite scholar, philosopher and writer who became famous as Anirvan later on) and "Swami Prajnananda Saraswati". Swearing in Swami Prajnanandaji as the mahant and Trustee of the "Saraswat Matha and Ashrama Establishments". Swami Nigamananda retired and resided in Nilachala Kutir in Puri for several years, until 1935.

100 Years of Saraswata Matha (1912–2011) 
This Institution (Shanti Ashram) or "Saraswata Matha" founded by Swami Nigamananda in 1912 (1319 BS) reached its hundredth anniversary on Akshaya Tritiya Baishakh, 2011 (1418 BS), i.e. 6 May 2011.

Nigamananda said, this matha is very dear to my heart, I can sacrifice my life hundred times for the sake of this matha.

Nilachala Saraswata Sangha 

Nigamananda accepted Jagannatha culture and advised his disciples to worship him according to their state/country's culture. He believed that Lord Jagannath is the "symbol of truth".

The day Sravan Purnima (full moon day), on 24 August 1934 Friday,  Nilachala Saraswata Sangha (NSS - नीलाचल सारस्वत संघ - ନୀଳାଚଳ ସାରସ୍ବତ ସଂଘ ପୁରୀ ) was established by Nigamananda at Nilachala Kutir (नीलाचल कुटीर-ନୀଳାଚଳ କୁଟିର), Puri. The Oriya devotees gathered there to celebrate his birthday. He advised them to form a religious circle. As per his wishes devotees started an association for religious talk and thus Nilachala Saraswata Sangha (the Sangha) came into existence to fulfill his tripartite objective: (1) leading an ideal family life, (2) establishment of combined power and (3) sharing of feelings.

Guru Braham Ashrams 
Nigamananda established Guru Brahama Ashrams (गुरु ब्रह्म आश्रम) where people from any faith can come and pray in their own ways.

He instituted five Ashrams in five divisions of undivided Bengal. They are Purba Bangala Saraswat Ashram at Moinamati, Comilla (Bangala Desh), now at Tripura, Madhya Bangala Saraswat Ashram at Kalni, Dacca, now Purbasthali Bardhaman district, Uttar Bangala Saraswat Ashram at Bogra, Paschima Bangala Saraswat Ashram at Kharkusama, Midnapore, Dakhina Bangala Saraswat Ashram at Halisahar, 24 Paragans.

Nigamananda installed Jagat Gurus Ashan (जगत गुरु आसन), in 1915 at Kokilamukh, Jorhat, Assam and established many ashrams and made thousands of disciples in the guru-shishya tradition.

Other foundations 
Followers of Nigamananda run Nigamananda Education Centers in Orissa, also schools and educational institutions around India.

Publications

Saraswata Granthavali 

Nigamananda wrote and published a series of books, known collectively as Saraswata Granthavali (सारस्वत ग्रंथावली). These are Brahmacharya Sadhan (ब्रह्मचर्य साधन), Yogiguru (योगिगुरु), Tantrikguru (तांत्रिकगुरु), Jnaniguru (ज्ञानीगुरु), and Premikguru (प्रेमिकगुरु) which dealt with the fundamentals of almost all modes of sadhana (spiritual practice) prevalent in Sanatan Dharma. Nigamanananda's followers believe that these books are useful to any faithful person and if practiced carefully will lead to success in spiritual pursuits. By Mohanty's efforts these books were translated from Bengali to Oriya.

Arya Darpan 
Nigamananda also published Arya Darpan (आर्य दर्पण), a monthly magazine on sanatana dharma, intended for disseminating non-sectarian spiritual knowledge among the masses. Many essays on important topics relating to religious and scriptural matters were included in this magazine.

Thakurer Chithi 
Advising his disciples, Nigamananda wrote letters, from which one hundred are collected in a book called Thakurer Chithi (ठाकुरेर चिठी). This information was published in a Calcutta magazine Modern Review, founded by Ramananda Chatterjee, on 26 December 1938.

Other Nigamananda collections are Maayer Kripa (मायेर कृपा), Vedanta Vivek (वेदांत विवेक) and Tattvamala (तत्वमाला).

Bhakta Sammilani 

Nigamananda created an annual conference called Bhakta Sammilani (भक्त सम्मिलनी) for householders and sanyasis, to strengthen prayer groups, discuss the importance of having a guru, review the well-being of sanyasis living in the ashrams, help solve problems pertaining to them and the ashrams as a whole, provide welfare, such as schools, for communities and to hold lectures by enlightened speakers on public spiritual life.

Nigamananda categorized Bhakta Sammilani into "Sarbabhouma" (Country wide or सार्बभौम भक्त सम्मिलनी) and "Pradeshika (State wide or प्रादेशिक भक्त सम्मिलनी.) The first "Sarbabhouma Bhakta Sammilani" was established by him at Kokilamukh in 1915. The first "Pradeshika Bhakta Sammilani" was held in 1947 by Nilachala Saraswata Sangha, Puri at Ankoli in the district of Ganjam during full moon day of maagha.

Nigamananda set a different prayer day for women disciples where they alone could participate and exchange their views.

He said in one sammilani, "my devotees are fully aware that I am pleased to see them congregated in this sammilani, once in a year during X-mas. Such gathering would bring fame to the maths and it would also do good to the world at large".

Legacy 
Nigamananda's birthday is celebrated every year on Sravan Purnima day at Nilachala Kutir in Oriya culture. On 10 August 2014 his 134th Birthday was celebrated at Nilachala Kutir. The 63rd Bhakta Sammilani was celebrated in February 2014 at Bhadrak.

See also 

 Indian Yogis
 Sri Anirvan
 Durga Charan Mohanty
 Nigamananda Bidyapitha
Mauni Baba
 Modern Review

Further reading

Books 
 Bengali
 
 
 
 
 
 

 Odia
 
 
 
 
 
 
 
 
 

 English

Libraries 
 English Literature
 The divine universal gospels of Sri Nigamananda National Library, Ministry of Culture, Government of India (Call No. E 294.598 D 496)
 Sadguru Nigamananda: a spiritual biography / Moni Bagchee Hathi Trust Digital Library
 Sadguru Nigamananda openlibrary.org

 Bengali Literature
 Premika Guru Author: Paramhansa, Nigamananda, West Bengal Public Library Network
 Yogi Guru Author: Paramhansa, Nigamananda, West Bengal Public Library Network

Letters 
 Thakurer Chithi (ठाकुरेर चिठी) A collection of 100 letters written by Swami Nigamananda Paramahansa to his disciples, The Modern review (page 337)

References

External links 

 
 Nigamananda, A site developed by absmath.org, dedicated to his life, works, teachings and philosophy.
 Sri Sri Thakur Nigamananda Nigam Sudha, A site dedicated to his Life, vaani, Ideals, Philosophy, Sammilani, Sangha, Written Books and about ABS Math(Assam Banigiya Saraswata Matha, Jorhat).
 Sri Sri Thakur Nigamananda NSS, A site dedicated to his Life, vaani, Ideals, Philosophy, Sammilani, Sangha, Written Books and about ABS Math(Assam Banigiya Saraswata Matha, Jorhat).

1880 births
1935 deaths
20th-century Indian philosophers
19th-century Hindu religious leaders
20th-century Hindu religious leaders
20th-century Hindu philosophers and theologians
Advaitin philosophers
Bengali Hindu saints
Bengali spiritual writers
Founders of new religious movements
Indian Hindu spiritual teachers
Indian Hindu yogis
Indian Hindu monks
People considered avatars by their followers
People from Nadia district
Shaktas
Tantric practices
Scholars from Kolkata